Ekaterina Karsten (Kaciaryna Karsten; ; born 2 June 1972) is a Belarusian rower, a seven-time Olympian and first medalist from Republic of Belarus, a two-time Olympic champion and six-time World Champion in the single scull.

Karsten won Olympic gold in the single sculls in Atlanta in 1996 and Sydney in 2000. At the 2004 Summer Olympics in Athens she won a silver medal and in 2008 in Beijing she picked up a bronze. She also won at the World Championships in single sculls in 1997, 1999, 2005, 2006, 2007 and 2009, was runner up in 2002 and 2010 and got bronze in 2001 and 2003. She won the European Championships in 2009 and 2010. She won the world junior championships in 1990.

Her maiden name is Khadatovich (Хадатовіч), and she is also sometimes referred to as Ekaterina Karsten-Khodotovitch. Currently she lives and trains in Germany with her German husband.

Facts 
 Height: 1.85 m (6 ft 1 in)
 Weight: 75 kg (165 lb)
 Birthplace: Asechyna, Belarus
 Residence: Potsdam, Germany

See also 
 List of multiple Summer Olympic medalists

References

External links 
 

1972 births
Living people
People from Krupki District
Soviet female rowers
Belarusian female rowers
Rowers at the 1992 Summer Olympics
Rowers at the 1996 Summer Olympics
Rowers at the 2000 Summer Olympics
Rowers at the 2004 Summer Olympics
Rowers at the 2008 Summer Olympics
Rowers at the 2012 Summer Olympics
Rowers at the 2016 Summer Olympics
Olympic rowers of Belarus
Olympic rowers of the Unified Team
Olympic gold medalists for Belarus
Olympic silver medalists for Belarus
Olympic bronze medalists for Belarus
Olympic bronze medalists for the Unified Team
Olympic medalists in rowing
Medalists at the 2008 Summer Olympics
Medalists at the 2004 Summer Olympics
World Rowing Championships medalists for the Soviet Union
Medalists at the 2000 Summer Olympics
Medalists at the 1996 Summer Olympics
Medalists at the 1992 Summer Olympics
World Rowing Championships medalists for Belarus
European Rowing Championships medalists
Sportspeople from Minsk Region